The SoLow Project is the solo album vocal bassist Barry Carl released after retiring from the a cappella group Rockapella. The album consists of 20 songs split into four sections: Seven Spirituals for Two Basses, a selection of Negro spirituals; Four Sea Chanties; Quatre Chansons de Don Quichotte, a collection of songs by French composer Jacques Ibert written for the 1933 G.W. Pabst film Don Quixote; and The Songs and Dances of Death, a song cycle written by Modest Mussorgsky.

Track listing

Personnel
 Barry Carl – bass, vocals
 Ron Levy – piano

External links
Barry Carl's website page on The SoLow Project

2004 classical albums